Ezra Matthew Miller (born September 30, 1992) is an American actor. Their feature film debut was in Afterschool (2008), which they followed by starring in the drama We Need to Talk About Kevin (2011) and The Perks of Being a Wallflower (2012). In 2015, they co-starred in the drama The Stanford Prison Experiment and the comedy Trainwreck, before playing Credence Barebone / Aurelius Dumbledore in the Fantastic Beasts films Fantastic Beasts and Where to Find Them (2016), Fantastic Beasts: The Crimes of Grindelwald (2018), and Fantastic Beasts: The Secrets of Dumbledore (2022). In 2020, they also had a recurring role on the miniseries The Stand as Donald Merwin "Trashcan Man" Elbert.

Miller also portrays the Flash in films and television series set in the DC Extended Universe (DCEU), first appearing in a cameo the films Batman v Superman: Dawn of Justice (2016) and Suicide Squad (2016), before having a more prominent role in Justice League (2017), its director's cut Zack Snyder's Justice League (2021), and The Flash (2023), as well as a cameo in the TV series Peacemaker (2022–present).

Since 2022, Miller has been accused of committing disorderly conduct, assault, and burglary, resulting in multiple widely publicized arrests and citations, and has also been accused of grooming minors.

Early life
Ezra Matthew Miller was born in Wyckoff, New Jersey, on September 30, 1992. They have two older sisters named Saiya and Caitlin. Their mother, Marta Miller (née Koch), is a modern dancer. Their father, Robert S. Miller, was senior vice president and managing director of Hyperion Books, and later became a publisher at Workman Publishing. Miller's father is Jewish; their mother is of Dutch and German descent. Miller identifies as Jewish and "spiritual". At the age of six, they started to train as an opera singer in order to overcome a speech impediment. They have sung with the Metropolitan Opera, and performed in the American premiere of Philip Glass's opera White Raven. Miller attended Rockland Country Day School and The Hudson School, dropping out at age 16 after the release of the film Afterschool.

Career

Miller's career in film began in 2008 with Antonio Campos' Afterschool, in the role of a teenager at a boarding school who accidentally films the drug-related deaths of two classmates, and is then asked to put together a memorial video. The following year, they appeared in City Island with Andy García, Julianna Margulies, and Steven Strait. In 2010, Miller portrayed the lead of Beware the Gonzo and had a supporting role in Every Day, both of which premiered at the Tribeca Film Festival. They next appeared in the BBC Films drama We Need to Talk About Kevin (2011), alongside Tilda Swinton and John C. Reilly, which was adapted and directed by Lynne Ramsay from American author Lionel Shriver's 2003 novel of the same name. In television, Miller played Damien on the Showtime hit comedy series Californication. They then appeared on Royal Pains as Tucker Bryant for two seasons. In the 2012 film adaptation of the novel The Perks of Being a Wallflower, Miller played Patrick, alongside Logan Lerman and Emma Watson.

Miller has been credited with singing, drumming and percussion on musical recordings by the band Sons of an Illustrious Father as early as 2011. The band is a trio that features Lilah Larson (vocals, guitar, bass and drums), Josh Aubin (bass, keyboards, guitar, vocals), and Miller. In 2019, the band released a cover of "Don't Cha" by the Pussycat Dolls and Miller appeared in its music video.

Miller played Credence Barebone in the 2016 film Fantastic Beasts and Where to Find Them, a spin-off of the Harry Potter film series. They reprised the role in the film's sequel, Fantastic Beasts: The Crimes of Grindelwald, which was released in November 2018, and in Fantastic Beasts: The Secrets of Dumbledore, released in April 2022.

Miller portrays Barry Allen as the Flash in Warner Bros.' DC Comics adaptations, first appearing in cameos in Batman v Superman: Dawn of Justice and Suicide Squad, and continuing the role as one of the leads in Justice League. They are set to play the character in the standalone film The Flash, which is to be released in 2023. Miller attended Middle East Film and Comic Con in 2018, representing their character in the DC Comics franchise film Justice League. In 2020, they reprised the role of the Flash for a cameo appearance in the Arrowverse crossover event, Crisis on Infinite Earths.

In December 2020, Miller portrayed Trashcan Man in the Paramount+ television miniseries The Stand, based on the Stephen King novel of the same name.

Personal life
In 2010, Miller dated Zoë Kravitz while they were filming Beware the Gonzo. Miller became engaged to Erin, a woman they began dating in 2016, but called it off after a spiritual adviser told them that she was a "parasite".

Miller came out as queer in 2012, but later said they avoided the use of the label "queer". They had also said in 2018, "Queer just means no, I don't do that. I don't identify as a man. I don't identify as a woman. I barely identify as a human." Miller uses they/them pronouns, which GQ wrote in 2020 was "a pointed refusal to be gendered". They previously used all pronouns interchangeably but, use they/them, it, or zir pronouns. Having expressed an interest in "kissing boys" at a young age, Miller said, "The way I would choose to identify myself wouldn't be gay. I've been attracted mostly to 'shes' but I've been with many people and I'm open to love whatever it can be." Miller also commented on having "a lot of really wonderful friends who are of very different sexes and genders. I am very much in love with no one in particular."

In 2018, Miller showed support for the #MeToo movement and revealed a personal experience concerning a Hollywood producer and a director, both of whom were left unnamed: "They gave me wine and I was underaged. They were like, 'Hey, want to be in our movie about gay revolution?' And I was like, 'No, you guys are monsters. Later that year, Miller announced that they were in a polyamorous relationship with multiple people, including their bandmates in the rock band Sons of an Illustrious Father.

Following the divorce of their parents in 2019, the status of Miller's mental health began to deteriorate, although their spokesperson denied that it was caused by the divorce. According to Insider, Miller began to travel while wearing a bulletproof vest and carrying at least one firearm in early 2022, following fears that they were being followed by members of the Ku Klux Klan and the Federal Bureau of Investigation (FBI). Tokata Iron Eyes, Miller's partner, later referred to their bulletproof vest as "a fashionable safety measure in response to actual attacks and received death threats."

On January 27, 2022, Miller posted a video on Instagram that seemed to threaten members of the Ku Klux Klan operating in Beulaville, North Carolina. In response, the Southern Poverty Law Center reported no knowledge of recent Klan activity in Beulaville.

Controversies and legal issues

Disorderly conduct
On June 28, 2011, in the midst of filming The Perks of Being a Wallflower, Miller was a passenger in a vehicle that was pulled over in Pittsburgh for a broken brake light; police discovered 20 grams of marijuana in Miller's possession. The actor was initially charged with drug possession, but the charge was later dropped by a judge. They instead faced a penalty of $600 for two citations of disorderly conduct. Miller later remarked, "I don't feel like there's any need to hide the fact that I smoke pot. It's a harmless herbal substance that increases sensory appreciation."

Strangling incident
On April 6, 2020, a video surfaced in a since-deleted tweet that appeared to show Miller strangling a woman and throwing her to the ground. The video was confirmed by Variety to have taken place at Prikið Kaffihús, a bar in Reykjavík, Iceland, that Miller frequents when in the city. A bar employee identified the person in the video as Miller, who was escorted off the premises by staff after the incident.

In September 2022, a representative for Miller claimed that the strangulation was a spontaneous reaction spurred by "a group of teenagers" taunting Miller over Miller's mixed martial arts skills.

Hawaii arrests
On March 28, 2022, Miller was arrested in Hawaii following what police said was a physical altercation with patrons after having hurled obscenities at customers at a karaoke bar and was charged with disorderly conduct and harassment. Miller later claimed that they became enraged after being "accosted by a Nazi". During the arrest, Miller claimed that they were being "unlawfully persecuted" and, after members of the police misgendered them, accused the officers of intentionally committing a hate crime.

Three weeks later, on April 19, 2022, Miller was again taken into custody for second-degree assault by Leilani Estates Subdivision police authorities in Pāhoa. According to Midi Libre, they were arrested for throwing a chair, which hit a 26-year-old woman and left a half-inch cut on her forehead, after being told to leave during a private get-together. Miller was arrested 20 minutes after the attack during a traffic stop in Kea'au. Just hours after this second arrest, Miller pleaded no contest to the karaoke incident and was fined $500 for disorderly conduct by judge Kanani Laubach.

Relationship with Tokata Iron Eyes
In June 2022, the Standing Rock Sioux tribal court issued a temporary order of protection against Miller on behalf of 18-year-old activist Tokata Iron Eyes. Her parents, Chase Iron Eyes and Sara Jumping Eagle, requested the court order because, they said, of Miller's use of "violence, intimidation, threat of violence, fear, paranoia, delusions, and drugs" to hold sway over their child. The relationship between Miller and Iron Eyes, which began in 2016 when Miller was aged 23 and Iron Eyes was aged 12, also included Iron Eyes flying to London in 2017 to visit Miller on the set of The Crimes of Grindelwald. Iron Eyes dropped out of school in 2021, which her parents believe she did in order to follow Miller. Her parents also stated in court documents that Miller had caused bruises on their child's body, and that Miller has groomed and manipulated her. Text and video responses were later posted on the Instagram account believed to belong to Iron Eyes, denying her parents' allegations; however, the parents countered by claiming their child did not have control over her social media account. Iron Eyes stated in the video response that it was her own choice not to have a phone. , law enforcement has been unable to locate Miller to serve them with the order. Miller then posted messages on their Instagram account mocking the court's attempts to find them, but has since deleted them.

In August, Miller's former music collaborator Oliver Ignatius stated that he had witnessed Miller verbally abuse Iron Eyes over her wearing makeup. Iron Eyes defended Miller by referring to the incident as "a catty comment" and a part of "queer dialogue"; she called the allegation of abuse "homophobic". According to a former resident of Miller's farm in Vermont, Miller believed that people criticized their relationship with Iron Eyes because she is "an apocalyptic Native American spider goddess" who, along with Miller as Jesus Christ, will bring about an Indigenous revolution. Miller allegedly refers to themself as a Messiah to Native Americans, although they do not have Indigenous ancestry.

Harassment allegations
On June 16, 2022, a mother and her twelve-year-old child were granted a temporary harassment prevention order against Miller in Massachusetts after they said that Miller threatened the woman's family and showed inappropriate behavior towards the child. According to the mother and child, Miller, who was originally visiting a neighbor, showed up at the family's house unexpectedly while wearing a bulletproof vest and brandishing a gun before "pestering" the child by "uncomfortably" touching the child's hips. The child's mother told Business Insider that Miller had known the family since February, had taken an interest in the child because of their "style and maturity level", and had offered to start a clothing line with the child and fund their attendance to a design school. The mother also said that Miller considered the child to be a powerful "mystical being" who "would be lucky to have Ezra to guide and protect them." Shortly before the order was granted in June, the mother stated, Miller arrived at the family's house dressed as a cowboy and attempted to buy the child's horses.

Vermont farm incidents 
As reported by Rolling Stone, Miller has been housing a woman they met in Hilo, Hawaii, and her three children on Miller's farm in Stamford, Vermont, since mid-April 2022. Allegations from both anonymous and named sources as well as the children's father are that guns and ammunition are easily accessible to the children, aged 1–5 years old, and that the one-year-old put a loose bullet in her mouth. The woman claims that Miller has offered a refuge for healing and an escape from the children's father, who she alleges is abusive. Further claims include assault rifles being propped up on piles of the children's stuffed animals, and "heavy marijuana use" with people smoking marijuana in front of the children in rooms without proper ventilation, including a witness stating that he "saw Miller blow marijuana smoke in the baby's face and use their arm to waft more smoke in the baby's direction." Rolling Stone also published that Miller has been running a large, unlicensed marijuana cultivation operation.

On the weekend of August 6, 2022, Vermont State Police approached Miller's residence and "repeatedly attempted to serve the mother an emergency care order that demanded the children's removal from her care and the home over fear for their safety... based on a [Department for Children and Families (DCF)] caseworker's affidavit, the State Attorney's office had requested two emergency care orders over the past week that sought to transfer legal custody of the children over to the state." Police and social workers were unable to locate the children or the mother. Miller told police that the woman and her children do not live there, and have not "for the past two months". Contradicting Miller, the DCF caseworker, in her affidavit to the Court, presented evidence that up until late July 2022, the woman had been regularly posting images on social media that confirm that she was living with Miller. The Vermont State Attorney's office stated  that Miller's response "seemed like an attempt to 'evade service of the order.

Burglary charge 
On August 7, 2022, Miller was charged with felony burglary in Stamford, Vermont, stemming from what the police report indicated was theft of bottles of alcohol from a private home in May 2022, according to Vermont State Police. According to the report, Miller was identified by police via video surveillance footage. Miller was due to be arraigned in court on September 26, 2022. A week prior to the planned arraignment date, a representative for Miller stated that the home is owned by a former childhood friend of Miller's and that Miller believed that they were welcome to enter the home to obtain rice wine for cooking.

The arraignment was later pushed back to October 17, 2022. Appearing in court remotely on that date, Miller pleaded not guilty to the charges. The next hearing on this case was scheduled for January 13, 2023. On January 12, 2023, they pleaded guilty to trespassing, leading to the burglary charge being dropped. On January 13, 2023, Miller's trespassing plea was approved by the court.

Treatment for mental health issues 
On August 15, 2022, a representative of Miller released a statement to Variety in which Miller apologized for the past behavior, stating that Miller had recently "gone through a time of intense crisis" and had begun treatment for "complex mental health issues". A September 2022 article in Vanity Fair quoted others as saying Miller has claimed to be Jesus, the devil, and the next Messiah. They believed their relationship with Iron Eyes would bring about the apocalypse. They also believed Freemasons were sending demons to kill them.

Filmography

Film

Television

Video games

Awards and nominations

See also
List of messiah claimants
List of people claimed to be Jesus
List of solved missing person cases

Explanatory notes

References

Further reading

External links

 

1992 births
2010s missing person cases
20th-century American actors
21st-century American actors
20th-century American Jews
21st-century American Jews
21st-century apocalypticists
Actors from New Jersey
American child actors
American film actors
American non-binary actors
American people of Dutch descent
American people of German descent
American television actors
Formerly missing people
Jewish American actors
Jewish messiah claimants
Jewish models
LGBT Jews
LGBT people from New Jersey
Living people
Missing person cases in the United States
Models from New Jersey
People from Wyckoff, New Jersey
Polyamorous people
The Hudson School alumni
Genderfluid people
Chopard Trophy for Male Revelation winners